Jean Mary Cummins (3 July 1920 – 29 March 1981) was an English cricketer who played as a opening batter. She appeared in three Test matches for England in 1954, all against New Zealand. She played domestic cricket for Surrey.

References

External links
 
 

1920 births
1981 deaths
People from Croydon
England women Test cricketers
Surrey women cricketers